Twelve Hours to Kill (also known as 12 Hours to Kill) is a 1960 American crime drama film directed by Edward L. Cahn and starring Nico Minardos and Barbara Eden.

Plot
Martin Filones (Nico Minardos), a young Greek man, witnesses the murder of gangster Frankie Russo, and is ushered off into the relative "safety" of suburban obscurity by Lt. Jim Carnevan (Grant Richards), unaware that he is being double-crossed by a crooked gendarme. Barbara Eden plays the femme fatale of the story.

Cast

 Nico Minardos as Martin Filones
 Barbara Eden as Lucy Hall
 Grant Richards as Det. Lt. Jim Carnevan
 Russ Conway as Capt. Willie Long
 Art Baker as Capt. Johns
 Gavin MacLeod as Johnny
 Kitty Kelly in a minor role
 Cece Whitney as Clara Carnevan
 Richard Reeves as Mark
 Byron Foulger as Elby Gardner
 Barbara Mansell as Cynthia
 Ted Knight as Police Sgt. Denton
 Shepherd Sanders as Frankie Russo
 Charles Meredith as Druggist
 Stewart Conway as Bert – Policeman
 Don Collier as Andy – Policeman

Production
Twelve Hours to Kill was the first lead role for Nico Minadros, who had been in Holiday for Lovers.

See also
 List of American films of 1960

References

External links 
 
 
 
 

Films directed by Edward L. Cahn
1960 crime drama films
1960 films
20th Century Fox films
CinemaScope films
American crime drama films
Films scored by Paul Dunlap
1960s English-language films
1960s American films